Achmad Syaiful Amry (born December 27, 1988) is an Indonesian footballer that currently plays for Gresik United in the Indonesia Super League.

References

External links

1988 births
Association football goalkeepers
Living people
Indonesian footballers
Liga 1 (Indonesia) players
Gresik United players
Badak Lampung F.C. players
Indonesian Premier Division players
Perseru Serui players